Brandon Halsey (born September 16, 1986) is an American professional mixed martial artist currently competing in the Light Heavyweight division of the Professional Fighters League. A professional competitor since 2012, he has formerly competed for M-1 Global and Bellator, where he was the Middleweight Champion.

Background
Originally from San Diego, California, Halsey began his career in combat sports from a young age as a wrestler and judoka. Halsey's father wrestled at UCLA and Halsey has two brothers who also competed at NCAA Division I colleges. Halsey attended Rancho Buena Vista High School where he competed in wrestling and excelled. He won a CIF state championship, and finished with the best overall record in school history with 150-16 and 80 pins. Halsey also competed in football as a linebacker and earned First Team All-San Diego County honors. Halsey originally attended Fresno State University, transferring to California State University at Bakersfield his sophomore year after Fresno State dropped their wrestling program. Halsey was very successful at CSUB, finishing 7th at the NCAA Division 1 National Championships and earning NCAA Division 1 All-American honors. Halsey specialized in folkstyle wrestling.

Mixed martial arts career

Early career
Halsey made his professional debut in 2012 against Chris Golz. Halsey won the bout via submission in the first round.

In his second fight, Halsey faced UFC veteran Shonie Carter. Halsey won the bout via unanimous decision.

Bellator MMA
After winning his first two fights, Halsey was signed by Bellator Fighting Championships and made his debut against Rocky Ramirez at Bellator 92 on March 7, 2013. Halsey won by technical submission in the third round.

Halsey fought Joe Yager at Bellator 96 on June 19, 2013 and won the bout via split decision.

Halsey faced UFC veteran Hector Ramirez at Bellator 106 on November 2, 2013. Halsey won the bout via TKO in the first round after using his superior wrestling to take the fight to the ground, transition immediately to the back, and unload with punches to the head until he earned the victory.

Season Ten Middleweight Tournament winner
In March 2014, Halsey entered into the Bellator Season Ten middleweight tournament when Dan Cramer versus Jeremy Kimball was cancelled. He fought Joe Pacheco at Bellator 116 on April 11, 2014. Halsey won the bout via unanimous decision. Halsey was scheduled to face Brett Cooper in the finals at Bellator 119 on May 9, 2014.  The bout, however, was delayed due to an injury sustained by Cooper. The Cooper fight took place at Bellator 122 on July 25, 2014. Halsey won the bout via submission in the first round.

Middleweight Champion
Halsey faced Alexander Shlemenko for the Bellator Middleweight Championship on September 26, 2014 at Bellator 126. Halsey won the bout via technical submission in the first round to become the new Bellator Middleweight Champion.

Halsey was expected to make his first title defense against Kendall Grove on May 15, 2015 at Bellator 137. However, Halsey failed to make weight and was subsequently stripped of the middleweight championship. Halsey won the fight via TKO in the fourth round.

Halsey next faced Rafael Carvalho for the vacant Bellator Middleweight Championship on October 23, 2015 at Bellator 144. After dominating the opening round with his grappling, Halsey lost the fight via TKO in the second after absorbing a kick to the liver.

Halsey faced John Salter on June 17, 2016 at Bellator 156. After sustaining an early cut via head kick, Halsey went on to lose the bout via submission in the first round.

On October 5, 2016, Halsey was released from Bellator.

M-1 Global 
On June 1, 2017, Halsey rematched Alexander Shlemenko at M-1 Challenge 79 and was submitted by strikes after 25 seconds of the first round, marking his third consecutive loss after starting his career 9-0.

He then face Mikhail Ragozin on September 23, 2017 at M-1 Challenge 83: Ragozin vs. Halsey. He won the fight via unanimous decision.

Personal life
Halsey and his wife Amber gave birth to their first child, daughter Savannah Rose, in June 2015.

Championships and accomplishments
Bellator MMA
Bellator Middleweight World Championship (One time)
Bellator Season Ten Middleweight Tournament Winner

Mixed martial arts record

|Lose
|align=center|12–5
|Jiří Procházka
|TKO (submission to punches)
|Rizin 14
|
|align=center| 1
|align=center| 6:30
|Saitama, Saitama, Japan
|
|-
|Win
|align=center|12–4
|Ronny Markes
|Decision (unanimous)
| PFL 9
| 
| align=center| 2
| align=center| 5:00
| Long Beach, California, United States
| 
|-
|Loss
|align=center|11–4
|Vinny Magalhães
|TKO (punches)
|PFL 5
|
|align=center|1
|align=center|1:34
|Uniondale, New York, United States
|
|-
|Win
|align=center|11–3
|Smealinho Rama
|TKO (doctor stoppage)
|PFL 2
|
|align=center| 3
|align=center| 0:01
|Chicago, Illinois, United States
| 
|-
| Win
|align=center|10–3
|Mikhail Ragozin
| Decision (unanimous)
|M-1 Challenge 83: Ragozin vs. Halsey 
|
|align=center| 3
|align=center| 5:00
|Kazan, Russia
|
|-
| Loss
|align=center|9–3
|Alexander Shlemenko
| TKO (body kick and punches)
|M-1 Challenge 79: Shlemenko vs. Halsey 2
|
|align=center| 1
|align=center| 0:25
|St. Petersburg, Russia
|
|-
| Loss
|align=center|9–2
|John Salter
| Submission (triangle choke)
|Bellator 156
|
|align=center| 1
|align=center| 4:03
|Fresno, California, United States
|
|-
| Loss
|align=center|9–1
|Rafael Carvalho
| TKO (body kick)
|Bellator 144
|
|align=center| 2
|align=center| 1:42
|Uncasville, Connecticut, United States
|
|-
| Win
|align=center|9–0
|Kendall Grove
| TKO (punches)
|Bellator 137
|
|align=center| 4
|align=center| 2:25
|Temecula, California, United States
|
|-
|Win
|align=center|8–0
|Alexander Shlemenko
|Technical Submission (rear-naked choke)
|Bellator 126
|
|align=center|1
|align=center|0:35
|Phoenix, Arizona, United States
|
|-
| Win 
| align=center|7–0
| Brett Cooper
| Submission (armbar)
| Bellator 122
| 
| align=center|1
| align=center|2:09 
| Temecula, California, United States
| 
|-
| Win
| align=center|6–0
| Joe Pacheco
| Decision (unanimous)
| Bellator 116
| 
| align=center|3
| align=center|5:00 
| Temecula, California, United States
| 
|-
|Win
|align=center|5–0
|Hector Ramirez
|TKO (punches)
|Bellator 106
|
|align=center|1
|align=center|0:52
|Long Beach, California, United States
| 
|-
|Win
|align=center|4–0
|Joe Yager
|Decision (split)
|Bellator 96
|
|align=center|3
|align=center|5:00
|Thackerville, Oklahoma, United States
| 
|-
|Win
|align=center|3–0
|Rocky Ramirez
|Technical Submission (arm-triangle choke)
|Bellator 92
|
|align=center|3
|align=center|0:50
|Temecula, California, United States
|
|-
|Win
|align=center|2–0
|Shonie Carter
|Decision (unanimous)
|KOTC: Reckless Abandon
|
|align=center|3
|align=center|5:00
|Highland, California, United States
|
|-
|Win
|align=center|1–0
|Chris Golz
|Submission (rear-naked choke)
|Respect in the Cage
|
|align=center|1
|align=center|1:46
|Pomona, California, United States
|

See also
 List of Bellator MMA alumni
 List of male mixed martial artists

References

External links

Bellator Profile

Living people
American male mixed martial artists
Middleweight mixed martial artists
Mixed martial artists utilizing collegiate wrestling
Mixed martial artists utilizing judo
1986 births
Bellator MMA champions
American male sport wrestlers
American male judoka